Xysticus funestus or the Deadly Ground Crab Spider is a species of ground crab spider in the family Thomisidae. It is found in North America.

Despite the common name, ‘Deadly Ground Crab Spider’, Xysticus funestus poses no threat to humans nor pets. Bites are extremely rare, due to the spider’s natural avoidance of humans, and are not life-threatening, typically only causing minor swelling and redness at the wound site.

References

 Bradley, Richard A. (2012). Common Spiders of North America. University of California Press.
 Ubick, Darrell (2005). Spiders of North America: An Identification Manual. American Arachnological Society.

External links

 NCBI Taxonomy Browser, Xysticus funestus

Thomisidae
Spiders described in 1880